The Preto River is a river of Goiás state in central Brazil. It is a tributary of the Paracatu River. It forms the Federal District's eastern boundary with Goiás and a short stretch with Minas Gerais.

References
Brazilian Ministry of Transport

See also
List of rivers of Goiás

Rivers of Federal District (Brazil)
Rivers of Goiás
Rivers of Minas Gerais